Holme is a civil parish in the South Lakeland District of Cumbria, England. It contains 14 listed buildings that are recorded in the National Heritage List for England.  All the listed buildings are designated at Grade II, the lowest of the three grades, which is applied to "buildings of national importance and special interest".    The parish contains the village of Holme and the surrounding countryside.  The Lancaster Canal passes through the parish, and nine structures on the canal are listed, eight bridges and a milepost.  The other listed buildings are a house, a farmhouse, two boundary stones, and a milepost on a road.


Buildings

References

Citations

Sources

Lists of listed buildings in Cumbria